

Rolf Johannesson (22 July 1900 – 6 December 1989) was a German admiral during World War II. He was a recipient of the Knight's Cross of the Iron Cross of Nazi Germany. He joined the post-war Bundesmarine in 1957 and retired in 1961 as a Konteradmiral.

Awards and decorations
 Iron Cross (1914) 2nd Class (19 July 1919)
 Destroyer War Badge (1940)
 Iron Cross (1939) 1st (6 November 1939) & 1st Class (15 December 1939)
 German Cross in Gold on 12 February 1942 as Fregattenkapitän on Z15 "Erich Steinbrinck"
 Knight's Cross of the Iron Cross on 7 December 1942 as Kapitän zur See and commander of destroyer Hermes 
 Grand Cross of the Order of Merit of the Federal Republic of Germany (12 June 1961)

References

Citations

Bibliography

 
 
 

1900 births
1989 deaths
Military personnel from Berlin
Reichsmarine personnel
Counter admirals of the Kriegsmarine
Imperial German Navy personnel of World War I
Bundesmarine admirals
Recipients of the clasp to the Iron Cross, 2nd class
German military personnel of the Spanish Civil War
Recipients of the Gold German Cross
Recipients of the Knight's Cross of the Iron Cross
Commanders Crosses of the Order of Merit of the Federal Republic of Germany
Condor Legion personnel
People from the Province of Brandenburg
Counter admirals of the German Navy
20th-century Freikorps personnel